Sam McKinniss (born 1985) is an American abstract and figurative postmodern painter based in Brooklyn.

Education 
Sam McKinniss was born in Minnesota and grew up in Connecticut. He graduated from the Glasgow School of Art, Glasgow, Scotland in 2005. He received a BFA in painting from the Hartford Art School in Hartford, Connecticut in 2007, and an MFA from the Steinhardt School at New York University in 2013.

Work
McKinniss's work has been shown in galleries and museums since 2005.
His first solo show in New York, entitled "Black Leather Sectional," opened at Joe Sheftel Gallery in May 2015 and his first solo show in Los Angeles, "Dear Metal Thing," opened at Team Bungalow in June 2015. His show "Egyptian Violet" opened at Team Gallery in New York in October 2016. He made his first appearance at the Miami edition of the international art fair Art Basel in 2015.

In his figurative painting, which has become the dominant practice, McKinniss works from photographs, found images as well as pictures he took. His subjects include reclining male nudes, images from popular culture, and floral still lifes. McKinniss develops a symbolist vocabulary for contemporary figurative painting; he sources material primarily from online image searching.

McKinniss has made a large number of paintings that mimic the still-lifes of the 19th-century artist Henri Fantin-Latour, for example, White Roses in a Short Glass (after Fantin-Latour). Latour’s influence on his style can be seen in the heightened colour contrasts with which he paints his figurative paintings.

McKinniss painted a series of "men in repose" for the second issue of Adult. His painting of Lorde was the cover art of her 2017 album Melodrama NME magazine selected the cover for their list of the best album art of the 21st century so far and it received praise from commentators at Billboard, Paste and Fuse.

Award
New Boston Fund Individual Artist Fellowship, Greater Hartford Arts Council, Hartford, Connecticut, 2009

References

Further reading 

21st-century American painters
1985 births
American contemporary painters
Living people
Painters from New York (state)